Louisiana State University School of Medicine refers to two separate medical schools in Louisiana: LSU School of Medicine in New Orleans and LSU School of Medicine in Shreveport.

See also
 LSU Health Sciences Center New Orleans
 LSU Health Sciences Center Shreveport
 Louisiana State University System

External links
 LSU Medical School in New Orleans Website
 LSU Health Sciences Center Shreveport Website

Louisiana State University System
Universities and colleges in New Orleans